Brick & Lace  are a Jamaican-American dancehall/R&B (or reggae fusion) musical duo consisting of sisters Nyanda and Nailah Thorbourne. According to Billboard, their name reflects the tough and the soft sides of femininity. 

Brick & Lace originally signed to the Geffen label as a trio with their third sister Tasha.

Nailah and Nyanda continue to perform while Tasha works behind the scenes and co-writes songs for the group. Their first Geffen Records' single "Get That Clear" and their first album Love Is Wicked were both released in 2006.

Career

Early life and career beginnings
Brick and Lace were signed by hip hop singer-songwriter Akon to his record label, Kon Live Distribution. They were born to a Jamaican father and an African American mother. The duo has toured internationally, including Kenya, Malawi, Nigeria, Rwanda, Senegal, Tanzania, Uganda,and Zimbabwe.

2007–10: Love Is Wicked and re-release
Their debut album, Love Is Wicked, had a limited release in various countries on 4 September 2007. The album spawned four singles, "Get That Clear (Hold Up)", "Never, Never", "Love Is Wicked" and "Take Me Back". "Love Is Wicked" was listed on six different charts, including the Sverigetopplistan, the Sweden Singles Top 60 and the France'd SNEP Singles Top 100. It reached number 6 on the Finland. Its highest entry was number 9 in the France Singles Top 100. "Never, Never" was a hit in Finland, performing also well in Kenya, where it reached No. 14 in 2008. Brick & Lace performed in Gwen Stefani's The Sweet Escape Tour on 24 May 2007, in Camden, New Jersey, filling in for Lady Sovereign, who failed to attend. In 2008, the after-effects of their first album hit and the sisters went busily on many tours for the year, most notably in Europe and Africa by popular demand, and also produced a few new songs such as "Cry on Me" and "Bad to di Bone".

In the year 2009, Brick and Lace released their single called "Bad to di Bone" which became a well-known track in European and African countries. A French collaboration was even presented hence popularity. This new single was intentionally pinned out to appear on a new upcoming album, but instead was re-based on "Love is Wicked", which was re-released for a second shot at fame and success. In July 2009, the duo penned another hit track called "Room Service", a summer hit released from the new Love is Wicked album.

Starting off the year 2010 with releasing four new songs in March, the Brick and Lace Summer 2010 European Tour was soon announced straight after. An upcoming second single and music video to promote their second album was said to be imminently soon when the girls were interviewed in December 2009. They released "Bang Bang", "Ring The Alarm", and "Shackles" as buzz singles for their upcoming album and withdrew "Club It Up" from internet markets for future plans. Finally settled with the release of their debut album, with two international platinum singles: "Love Is Wicked" and "Bad To Di Bone", the sisters started the last of the Love Is Wicked International Tour era by producing a final tour for the African, European and Asian fans globally. Soon after May 2010, they revealed to African press that Nyanda was pregnant and was expecting a baby soon.

2011–12: Independent return, new album plans and Bloodline 
There has been a buzz on the internet stating that the girls will be releasing a second album in 2011–12. Starting off the year 2011, Brick and Lace toured in January and February internationally across Europe, Asia-Pacific and Africa. Soon after Nyanda, the elder of the two, who was already in late pregnancy, has gone on a break for health cares and her soon to be born baby. Brick and Lace's younger sister Candace has currently filled in for her for any tour representation. Latest news is that Brick and Lace will be touring Europe yet again in April, May and June 2011. It has been revealed that Nyanda has already given birth to her baby and is already two months post-pregnancy. She has returned to Brick & Lace representation. Currently, the girls are working with French heavyweight DJs, Golden Crew and Martiniquean artist Lynnsha, in their next hit song called "In Love with the Music". The Video has already been record and as is the song; awaiting release. A snippet of the song was released for one official week and the song transcends more on techno roots, new to Brick & Lace's style. On 19 April 2011, Brick and Lace released their new single alongside Golden Crew, called "In Love with the Music". The song also has a French version featuring Lynnsha. The French version is said to appear on Golden Crews next album, while the International US Version is set to appear off Brick and Lace's second album as a possible Lead Single. There is also a buzz on the internet stating that the girls have broken away from Konlive Records and are working with Atlantic Records, as it shows on their Myspace page. They are currently working with Darkchild and other producers on their second album and have another album called yupa

In September 2011, Brick and Lace released a cover of Jennifer Lopez's hit single "I'm into You", under the request of fans who kept saying that J.Lo's single sounded like the Jamaican duo. The sisters also stated in an interview with Belgium Media 1 TV that they are indeed currently working on their second album and have started a song-writing team with their two other sisters, Candace and Tasha Thorbourne. Their song-writing team is called Bloodline, and they have released an official remix, done by heavyweight Techno DJ Sydney Sampson, for their debut Bloodline single called "This Time". The single features production from Tearce Kizzo, who has worked with artists such as Eva Simmons, and it has been released under massive European label Spinnin Records.

In November 2011, Brick and Lace released the video for their new single, called "This Time". The song encompasses Techno and House elements, new to Brick and Lace's style, however portraying the diversity of which these two beauties hold in the music industry. The Jamaican sisters are not featured in the video, however the use of European Models and the producer, Tearce Kizzo, shows the scenes of a pool party and sophisticated yet summer feeling of Ibiza. Starting off the year 2012, as their song writing team, Bloodline is currently working with producer team cave (Jonas Saeed & Niclas Kings) for Jennifer Lopez and Wisin y Yandel, where they have received their first single placement, having written Wisin & Yandel ft Jennifer Lopez's new single, called "Follow The Leader".

Brick & Lace also released another "buzz" single called "How I Like It", which features production from DJ Remady, a famous Swiss producer. The track is featured on his album called, The Original, and it encompasses dance and electro beats. The song has apparently gained a lot of recognition via the internet, although it is not a single for Remady's album.

In 2012, Brick & Lace also released bi-lingual music for their French fans with artists like Rim-K and Vincenzo. The track "Grenade" from Vincenzo's album La Matrice and "Take It to the Ring", a demo track by Dj Zack. As their song writing team Bloodline, the sisters co-wrote Christina Aguillera's "Around The World" from her album, Lotus.

2013–present: solo careers, talk shows and break from Brick & Lace
After touring Africa with artists such as US rapper Eve, Brick & Lace started off the year 2013 by going on solo careers. This lead a wildfire rumour all over the internet stating that the sisters had split and that Brick & Lace was no more. However, according to their Twitter and Facebook pages, Nailah and Nyanda both decided to take a break from the Brick & Lace dynamic for at least a year, so that they may explore more of their own creativity as solo artists. However, each sister stated that they would return as Brick & Lace to continue working on their second album.

Nyanda, the elder of the two, released a dance hall remix to Taylor Swift's "I Knew You Were Trouble" single. The remix single gained positive reviews all over the internet and has even been placed on many African charts and on the UK Top 30 club charts for a number of weeks. Nyanda has also been releasing many promotional singles, for her upcoming solo album, with hits such as "Like A Pro" with The Wizard and Chedda, and "Slippery When Wet (In the Middle)" with Black Lion Music Group. Nyanda also did a feature on Nicki Minaj & French Montana's "Freaks" single. Nyanda has also released a new dance hall single which features Black Lion and Mr Vegas, called "Boom and Rave". She released a House single in South Africa called "Cool & Deadly" with DJ Euphonik and DJ Fresh, and another English-French single ft Muss called "You Got Me Good".

Nyanda recently released a Music Video, on 26 June 2013, for "Slippery When Wet", which was directed by Muss as well.

The younger half, Nailah, under new stage name "Nyla", has also released her solo project, starting off with a signing under Ky-mani Marley's new record label, Konfrontation Music, and the debut of her solo single called "Stand Up", written by The Cave Production Team in Sweden and Bloodline, and produced by CMC Productions from Miami.

As their song writing team Bloodline, they are currently working with Pharrell's artist, Leah LaBelle and Christina Millian, on her upcoming album. One of their Bloodline demo tracks was leaked in April, called "Geisha Girl", where Brick & Lace fans were delighted to the sisters unexpected and unofficial "return". One of Bloodline's singles was also recently released and is sung by artist Leah Labelle and produced by Spanish DJ, Brian Cross called "Shot Gun", which appears on Brian Cross' 2013 album as its lead single. Nyanda also appears on the dance hall remix version of Leah Labelle's single called "Lolita".

During the summer of 2014, Nyanda, Nailah and younger sister I-Candy were each nominated for RLM World Music Video Awards. Nailah won captured the Best R&B Video award with her song "Stand Up." Nyanda won the Best Dance Music Video award with her song "I Love Sax." She also won Best Female Artist and was featured on the Best Reggae Music Video winning song "Like a Pro" which was won by The Wizard.

During that year, Nyla also released her second single called "Body Calling" and a music video for it, directed by Rona Cohen. She also collaborated with Reggae/ Dancehall icon Sean Paul on "Pornstar", a racy dance anthem from his Full Frequency album, and African artist Redsan, on "Touch Me There". Nyanda also worked with Ian Thomas on "Run Away". Nyanda and Nyla later reunited in November, as Brick & Lace once again, and went on to tour Australia.

2015 saw the start of both Nyanda and Nyla, joining their elder sister Tasha, to create their own Production called 'Chit Chat'; an online talk show, which is featured on YouTube, with a new episode airing every week. Chit Chat combines humor and style, touching on the latest fashions, news and trends.

On March 23, 2015, it was revealed that Nyla was working with Major Lazer on a song entitled "Light It Up", which will be featured on Lazer's 'Peace Is The Mission' album, released June 1; the song peaked at number 50 in Austria. The Light It Up Remix with Fuse ODG was released later on this year and charted as a European Single. Nyanda collaborated with TommoProduction from Romania, and spawned her two Singles, "Put It On Me" and the Chart-topping "All My Love".

Discography

Albums

Singles

References

External links
Brick & Lace 
Geffen Records: Brick & Lace
RudeGal.com: Brick and Lace, August 2006 
YardFlex.com: Geffen Records Presents Brick & Lace! – Debut Single 'Get That Clear' Featuring Akon!
Brick & Lace – Love Is Wicked – Charts in France.net
Brick & Lace at acharts.us
MusicRemedy.com: Brick & Lace – Love is Wicked

Reggae fusion groups
Jamaican musical duos
Contemporary R&B duos
Sony Music Publishing artists
Girl groups
Reggae duos
Sibling musical duos
Sibling musical trios
Musical groups established in 2004
Female musical duos
21st-century Jamaican women singers